The 1913 Nebraska Cornhuskers football team represented the University of Nebraska as a member of the Missouri Valley Conference (MVC) during the 1913 college football season. The team was coached by third-year head coach Ewald O. Stiehm and played its home games at Nebraska Field in Lincoln, Nebraska. The 1913 season was part of Nebraska's 34-game unbeaten streak that ran from 1912 to 1916. This was the first season that Nebraska conducted a spring football practice session.

Schedule

Coaching staff

Roster

Starters

Game summaries

Washburn

Sources:

Kansas State

Sources:

Minnesota

Sources:

Nebraska used a second-half touchdown to win for just the second time against Minnesota in 13 meetings. Minnesota coach Henry L. Williams said after the game "I cannot say I expected the Gophers to be defeated. Nebraska has a great team."

Haskell

Sources:

at Iowa State

Sources:

Nebraska Wesleyan

Sources:

at Kansas

Sources:

Iowa

Sources:

Awards

References

Nebraska
Nebraska Cornhuskers football seasons
Missouri Valley Conference football champion seasons
College football undefeated seasons
Nebraska Cornhuskers football